The cape blue-eye (Pseudomugil majusculus) is a species of fish in the subfamily Pseudomugilinae. It is endemic to Papua New Guinea.

References

Pseudomugil
Freshwater fish of Papua New Guinea
Taxa named by Walter Ivantsoff
Taxa named by Gerald R. Allen 
Fish described in 1984
Taxonomy articles created by Polbot